Transgaz is a state-owned company, which is the technical operator of the national natural gas transmission system in Romania. The company handled in 2017 a quantity of 12.87 billion m³ of natural gas.

The company has a total transport capacity of 30 billion m³ of natural gas and a pipe network of 13,000 km.

Transgaz is a member of the European Network of Transmission System Operators for Gas.

Connections to other countries
Hungary through the Arad–Szeged pipeline 
Ukraine through Cernauti-Siret natural gas pipeline
Bulgaria through Negru Voda natural gas pipeline and Giurgiu–Ruse pipeline
Moldova through Iași-Ungheni gas pipeline that was inaugurated on 27 August 2014.

Shareholders

Although state-owned, Transgaz was partially privatised in 2007 and 2013 respectively.

The current shareholder structure, as of 2018:

 Ministry of Economy: 58,5097%
 Other shareholders: 41.4903%

Listing on the Bucharest Stock exchange
On 26 November 2007, Transgaz issued an IPO on the BSE aiming to earn around US$84 million for developing on the local market and abroad but at the end of the IPO offer the company earned a total sum of US$2.52 billion making it the largest IPO on the BSE surpassing Transelectrica which earned US$308 million in 2006.

On 15 April 2013, there was a SPO on the BSE for 15% of the company that raised US$95 million.

See also
Arad–Szeged pipeline
Nabucco pipeline
European Network of Transmission System Operators for Gas
Gazprom Transgaz Belarus

External links
 Transgaz - company website

References

Oil and gas companies of Romania
Natural gas pipeline companies
Companies listed on the Bucharest Stock Exchange
Mediaș
Companies of Sibiu County